Saturna is an unincorporated locality on Saturna Island, one of the Southern Gulf Islands of British Columbia, Canada.  Saturna is the location of the island's BC Ferries terminal.

References

Unincorporated settlements in British Columbia
Gulf Islands